This is a list of Iranian Hazfi Cup winning football managers.

By year

The performance of the managers in the finals

By nationality

See also
 Hazfi Cup
 List of Iranian Football League winning managers
 List of Iranian Super Cup winning managers
 List of Iranian Futsal League winning managers

References

External links
Iran Pro league official history

 

Hazfi Cup
Hazfi Cup
winn